The Army Foundation College (AFC) is located in Harrogate, North Yorkshire, England. It is the only British Army establishment that delivers initial military training (Phase 1 training) to Junior Soldiers (aged between 16 years and 17 years, 5 months when they start).

History
The Royal Signals Apprentices School was established in Harrogate to provide military and vocational training for the Royal Corps of Signals, Royal Artillery (RA) and Royal Engineers (RE) in 1947. It was renamed the Army Apprentices College in 1961 when the RA and RE were relocated, providing Royal Signals training until it closed in 1998. In September 1998, the site reopened as the Army Foundation College to provide initial military training to the army's youngest other ranks trainees, aged between 16 years and 17 years, 5 months, for a range of combat arms and services. It was rebuilt by Jarvis under a private finance initiative contract worth £526.6 million between 2000 and 2002.

Tom Moore was appointed as the first honorary colonel of the college on his 100th birthday, in recognition of his fundraising success during the 2020 COVID-19 pandemic. When acting in that capacity, he was addressed as 'Colonel Tom'.

Training 

AFC delivers two Phase 1 (initial military training) courses:
 Junior Soldiers enlisted for roles in combat arms (the infantry, Royal Artillery and Royal Armoured Corps) are enrolled on a 49-week course. Junior Soldiers enlisted for roles in the Parachute Regiment are also enrolled on the Operation Achilles pathway during their last 12 weeks of phase 1 training.
 Junior Soldiers enlisted for other army trades complete a shorter, 23-week course.
Despite the differing course lengths, all recruits are trained to the same standard of the Common Military Syllabus (see Selection and Training in the British Army).

Intake and retention 
There are two entry points annually, in September and March; and two graduations, also in September and March.

Each year, approximately 1,200 boys and 100 girls begin their army training at AFC, of whom approximately 500 are training for infantry roles.

Official figures for the period from 2017–18 to 2020–21 show that, on average, 70% of recruits on the 49-week course complete their year at the college.

Education 
In addition to initial military training, Junior Soldiers can study Functional Skills courses in maths, English and IT at Levels 1 and 2, provided by TQ Pearson. Those who already have qualifications in mathematics and English have the option to study two units of a BTEC Certificate in Public Services at Level 3, however not the full qualification.

The education provided has drawn both praise and criticism.

Running costs 
In 2017, it cost the British Army approximately £62 million per annum to operate AFC.

Controversy

Cost of service delivery
, the cost of fully training an infantry soldier through AFC, at £103,000, was twice that of training an adult recruit to the same standard for the same job at the Infantry Training Centre in Catterick, at £53,000.

The British Army's policy of enlisting from age 16 has also been criticised for leading to lower trainee retention than is found among adult recruits.

Age of enlistment 
In view of developing children's rights standards and evidence showing a detrimental impact of military training and employment on younger recruits, several bodies, including the Children's Commissioners for each of the four nations of the UK and the UN Committee on the Rights of the Child, have also called on the armed forces to raise the minimum age of enlistment to 18.

In response to these concerns, the Ministry of Defence (MOD) has defended the current policy, stating in 2016: 'The army needs to attract school and college leavers at the earliest opportunity.' In the same year, the Chief of the General Staff, General Sir Nick Carter, added: '[T]he fact that our junior entry is always 100% manned is indicative of people finding that it is something that is really positive to do.'

Duty of care

Ofsted grade 
In 2018 and 2021, the education inspectorate Ofsted awarded the college an 'outstanding' grade for its duty of care. The 2021 report noted: 'Recruits speak consistently of fair and respectful treatment from all staff...'

Abuse allegations 
Between 2014 and 2020, recruits made 62 formal complaints of allegations of assault or other ill-treatment by staff at the college. 13 of the allegations were proven following investigation, of which seven occurred since 2017.

In 2021, nine investigations were opened into sexual offences against 22 girls at AFC; in one investigation, three of the suspected perpetrators were members of staff. The revelations were the subject of a Vice News report in July 2022.

Recruit abuse investigation 2014–18 

In 2017, the MOD confirmed reports that 17 instructors at AFC would be standing trial at court martial for 40 counts of alleged physical abuse of recruits during battle camp at Kirkudbright, Scotland, in 2014. ForcesTV, and the Guardian reported that the allegations included assault, holding trainees' heads under water, and forcing animal dung into their mouths. The case was reported as the British Army's largest ever investigation of abuse.

At a preliminary hearing in September 2017, the accused pleaded not guilty to all charges. The trial in February 2018 collapsed after the judge ruled that the investigation by the Royal Military Police had been 'seriously flawed', and that a fair trial for the defendants would no longer be possible.

An internal review confirmed multiple failings by the Royal Military Police. It noted that, in addition to recruits who had lodged formal complaints, 'a considerable number of JS [junior soldier recruits] who had been the subject of ill treatment / assaults' had not wished to do so.

See also

 Association of Harrogate Apprentices – includes a general history of Uniacke Barracks
 Selection and Training in the British Army
 Military recruitment
 Recruit training
 Military service
Children in the military
History of children in the military
Army Foundation College recruit abuse investigation, 2014–18

References

External links
 Army Foundation College, Harrogate – British Army website

Training establishments of the British Army
Military units and formations established in 1998
Buildings and structures in Harrogate
Education in Harrogate